Presbyterian Hospital may refer to:

 New York-Presbyterian Hospital, a hospital in New York City
 Presbyterian Hospital (New York City), one of the two hospitals that merged to form New York-Presbyterian
 Presbyterian Hospital (Charlotte), a hospital in Charlotte, North Carolina
 Presbyterian Hospital (Albuquerque), a hospital in Albuquerque, New Mexico
 Presbyterian Hospital (Chicago, Illinois), a hospital that merged with St. Luke's Hospital (Chicago, Illinois) (and later merged with Rush University Medical Center)
 Presbyterian Hospital (Dallas), a hospital in Dallas, Texas
 Presbyterian Hospital, Durtlang, a hospital in Aizawl, India
 UPMC Presbyterian, hospital of the University of Pittsburgh Medical Center in Pittsburgh, Pennsylvania
 Presbyterian Hospital, Ghana, a hospital in Ghana, Ashanti Region